Saikyo may refer to:
Saikyō Line, a Japanese railway line in the Tokyo metropolitan area
Saikyō Maru, a Japanese ship involved in the Battle of the Yalu River (1894) 
Western Capital (disambiguation), several topics

People with the surname Saikyo include:
Haruma Saikyo (born 1998), Japanese kickboxer
Yuma Saikyo (born 2000), Japanese kickboxer

See also